The 1992–93 Wright State Raiders men's basketball team represented Wright State University in the 1992–93 NCAA Division I men's basketball season. The Raiders, led by head coach Ralph Underhill, played their home games at the Nutter Center in Dayton, Ohio, as members of the Mid-Continent Conference. The Raiders finished tied for second in regular season standings, and won the Mid-Con tournament title to earn an automatic bid to the NCAA tournament – the first NCAA Tournament berth in school history – as the No. 16 seed in the Midwest region. Wright State was beaten by No. 1 seed Indiana in the opening round, 97–54.

Roster 

Sources

Schedule and results

|-
!colspan=12 style=|Regular season

|-

|-

|-

|-

|-

|-

|-

|-

|-

|-

|-

|-

|-

|-

|-

|-

|-

|-

|-

|-

|-

|-

|-

|-

|-

|-
!colspan=12 style=| Mid-Con tournament

|-

|-
!colspan=12 style=| NCAA tournament

Sources

Awards and honors
Bill Edwards – Mid-Con Player of the Year

Statistics

References

Wright State Raiders men's basketball seasons
Wright State
Wright State
Wright State Raiders men's basketball
Wright State Raiders men's basketball